Gonzalo Martín Bravo (born 18 May 1990) is an Argentine professional footballer who plays as a midfielder or forward for Deportivo Riestra.

Career
Bravo began his career with Centro Español. He scored twenty goals across one hundred and twelve fixtures in four years from 2009 in Primera D Metropolitana. On 29 August 2013, Bravo completed a move to Deportes Linares of the Chilean Segunda División. He made his bow for the club on 1 September against Malleco Unido, which preceded the player scoring for the first time in a 1–1 draw with Deportes Iberia in October. A brace over Ñublense B followed in February 2014, as he appeared in a total of twenty-one matches as they finished seventh. June 2014 saw Bravo join tier four's Deportivo Riestra.

Bravo won promotion in his first campaign with Deportivo Riestra, netting twice in eighteen as they earned a place in Primera B Metropolitana for 2015. Forty-nine games and seven goals occurred in the next two seasons. On 19 July 2016, Bravo was signed on loan by Primera División team Defensa y Justicia. His bow came on 10 September versus San Lorenzo, as he featured in what his only league appearance; though he did play in the Copa Argentina. He returned to Riestra for 2016–17 promotion, prior to leaving on loan again in 2017 - to UAE First Division League side Fujairah; managed by Diego Maradona.

Back with Deportivo Riestra, after relegation from Primera B Nacional, Bravo scored twenty goals in 2018–19 as they reached the promotion play-offs; he netted braces against Tristán Suárez (home and away), San Miguel, UAI Urquiza and All Boys alongside a hat-trick over Justo José de Urquiza on 3 December 2018.

Career statistics
.

References

External links

1990 births
Living people
People from Tres de Febrero Partido
Argentine footballers
Association football midfielders
Association football forwards
Argentine expatriate footballers
Expatriate footballers in Chile
Expatriate footballers in the United Arab Emirates
Argentine expatriate sportspeople in Chile
Argentine expatriate sportspeople in the United Arab Emirates
Primera D Metropolitana players
Segunda División Profesional de Chile players
Primera C Metropolitana players
Primera B Metropolitana players
Argentine Primera División players
UAE First Division League players
Primera Nacional players
Centro Social y Recreativo Español players
Deportes Linares footballers
Deportivo Riestra players
Defensa y Justicia footballers
Fujairah FC players
Sportspeople from Buenos Aires Province